Basangi is a small village located at Jiyyammavalasa Mandal in Parvathipuram Manyam District, a northern coastal districts of Andhra Pradesh, India.

Demographics 
According to Indian census, 2001, the demographic details of Basangi village is as follows:
 Total Population: 	977 in 243 Households
 Male Population: 	469 and Female Population: 	508
 Children Under 6-years of age: 123 (Boys – 61 and Girls – 62)
 Total Literates: 	399

References 

Villages in Parvathipuram Manyam district